, also spelled Yamanouchi (1545/1546? – November 1, 1605). He was retainer of Oda Nobunaga and later Toyotomi Hideyoshi. His father Yamauchi Moritoyo, was a descendant of Fujiwara no Hidesato, a senior retainer of the Iwakura Oda clan (opposed to Oda Nobunaga), and lord of Kuroda castle in Owari Province at the end of the Sengoku period of Japan. He was famous as the husband of Yamauchi Chiyo.

Military life

When he was still a 400-Koku lord, many great people as children were entrusted to him, such as Kuroda Nagamasa when he was hostage of Oda Nobunaga and Toyotomi Hidetsugu were taught by him.

He participated at Battle of Anegawa 1570 in the Oda's side.
After the Siege of Odawara (1590) and the rise to power of Toyotomi Hideyoshi, Tokugawa Ieyasu was forced to trade his domains in the Tōkai region for the Kantō region instead. Kazutoyo was relinquished Kakegawa Castle from Hideyoshi.

In 1600, Kazutoyo fought at the Battle of Sekigahara on Tokugawa Ieyasu's side. After battle, Kazutoyo built Kōchi Castle in what was then the province of Tosa. Kazutoyo held the title of Tosa no kami. His life spanned the closing years of the Sengoku period, the Azuchi–Momoyama period, and the beginning of the Edo period.

Just four years after he became Lord of Tosa, Kazutoyo died without issue aged around 60, and was succeeded as Lord of Tosa by his nephew Tadayoshi.

Family
 Father: Yamauchi Moritoyo (1510-1559)
 Mother: Hoshuin (d.1586)
Kazutoyo's success was mainly thanks to his shrewd and loyal wife Yamauchi Chiyo, who secured his promotion by spending all her money on a magnificent thoroughbred horse for him to impress his superiors. When they were separated during the war, Chiyo also risked her life to provide her husband with secret information. Kazutoyo's daughter, Yonehime, was killed during the 1586 Tenshō earthquake.
 Wife: Endo Chiyo (1557-1617) later Genshoin, daughter of Endo Morikazu, lord of Gujo-Hachiman castle
 Daughter: Yonehime (1580-1586)
 Adopted:
 Shonan Shoka (1586-1637)
 Yamauchi Tadayoshi (1592-1665)

In drama
The 45th NHK Taiga drama (2006) is a dramatization of the life of Kazutoyo, with his wife Chiyo as the central character. Kōmyō ga Tsuji stars Nakama Yukie as Chiyo. Takaya Kamikawa plays Kazutoyo. The story tells how Yamauchi Chiyo, as a wise and beautiful wife, helped her husband Yamauchi Kazutoyo up from an ordinary samurai to the governor of an entire province, Tosa. The story is by Shiba Ryōtarō.

Further reading
Tabata Yasuko 田端泰子. Yamanouchi Kazutoyo to Chiyo: Sengoku bushi no kazokuzō 山內一豊と千代 : 戦国武士の家族像. Tokyo: Iwanami Shoten 岩波書店, 2005.

References

External links

|-

|-

Daimyo
1540s births
1605 deaths
Deified Japanese people
People from Aichi Prefecture